Bank Bang is a 2008 Greek comedy film directed by Argyris Papadimitropoulos.

Plot
The story of the film revolves around two brothers Mixalis and Nodas who run a funeral office constantly making plans about how to make a lot of money. However, Nodas is in trouble with the Greek mafia and owes them a large sum of money. He suggests to Mixalis to start robbing banks in order to pay off his debt. Things start getting complicated when the chief of police, in order to deal with the rising number of bank robberies, places undercover police officers in every bank in the country. The situation goes out of control when Mixalis falls in love with a bank employee who has a rather graphical family life.

Casting
Kostas Voutsas as Ermolaos
Vassilis Charalambopoulos as Mixalis
Dimitris Imelos as Nodas
Marisa Triantafilidou as Lena
Katerina Mavrogeorgi as Mina
Mixalis Iatropoulos as Makis
Gerasimos Skiadaresis as Kostas
Dimitris Mavropoulos as Bazoukas
Tzeni Botsi as Katia
Thanos Samaras as Doukas
Skotis Drosos as Sam
Ieronimos Kaletsanos
Giannis Tsimitselis
Fanis Mouratidis
Orfeas Avgoustidis

Awards

References

External links

2008 films
Greek comedy films